John Daly (born 1889) was an Irish hurler who played for the Laois senior team.

Daly was a regular member of the starting fifteen during the successful 1915 championship campaign. That year he won one All-Ireland medal and one Leinster medal.

At club level Daly enjoyed a lengthy career, playing with Rathdowney.

References

1889 births
Rathdowney hurlers
Laois inter-county hurlers
All-Ireland Senior Hurling Championship winners
Year of death missing